The École de maistrance is the training school for future non-commissioned officers in the French Navy.  It was set up in 1933 under this name, it is now part of the Brest Naval Training Centre and within the remit of the Direction du personnel militaire de la marine (DPPM).  It is currently headed by capitaine de frégate Gabriel Steffe.

The school has an annual intake of up to 400 young people aged 18 to 25, from "bac à bac +2" level - on 14 July 2008, for example, it had 224 students in total, including 55 women.  The initial course lasts 18 weeks, followed by 6 months' specialist training (3.5 years for medical students) and 3 weeks complementary training in management.  Students wear the rank badge of a "second maître maistrancier" (equivalent to quartermaster, 1st class), with the blue stripes bordered in red, and become second maîtres on graduation.

In 1958 the École de maistrance received the banner of the École des mousses, decorated with the Légion d'honneur, the Croix de guerre 1914-1918, the Croix de guerre 1939-1945 and the Croix de guerre des Théâtres d'opérations extérieures.

See also
École nationale des sous-officiers d'active for the French Army.
École de formation des sous-officiers de l'armée de l'air for the French Air Force

External links

École de maistrance - official pages

French Navy
Military academies of France
Naval academies